Thommante Makkal is a 1965 Indian Malayalam film,  directed by J. Sasikumar and produced by Kasinathan. The film stars Sathyan, Madhu, Sheela and Kaviyoor Ponnamma in the lead roles. The film had musical score by M. S. Baburaj and Job & Geoege The film was a debut as a child artist to actress Shobha Mohan.

Cast
Sathyan as Pappachan
Madhu as Kunjachan
Ambika as Shoshamma
Sheela as Marykutty
Kottarakkara Sreedharan Nair as Thomachan
Kaviyoor Ponnamma as Achamma, Thomachan's wife
Adoor Bhasi as Ousephachan
Adoor Pankajam as Oromma
K. S. Gopinath as James
Nilumbur Ayisha as Shoshamma's mother
Joseph Chacko as Kapyar
Raadha as Chinnamma, Thomachan's daughter
Shobha Mohan as Young Chinnama/Child Artist

Soundtrack
The music was composed by M. S. Baburaj and K. V. Job and the lyrics were written by Vayalar Ramavarma and Varghese Maliyekkal.

References

External links
 

1965 films
1960s Malayalam-language films
Films directed by J. Sasikumar
Films scored by M. S. Baburaj